U.S.E. is a 2004 album by United State of Electronica. It was produced, recorded, and mixed by Jason Holstrom and U.S.E.

Track listing
"IT IS ON!"
"Emerald City"
"Climb the Walls (Umbrella of Love)"
"All Sounds & All People"
"Open Your Eyes"
"Takin' it All the Way"
"...City of Stars"
"Night Shift"
"There's Always Music"
"Vamos a la Playa"
"...The Chase"
"La Discoteca"

References

United State of Electronica albums
2004 albums